Helmy Kresa, (born in Meissen, Germany on November 7, 1904, died 1991, Long Island, New York) was a songwriter and the principal arranger and orchestrator for Irving Berlin.

In 1931 Kresa wrote "That's My Desire," which Frankie Laine, Louis Armstrong and a host of others recorded. He also composed the instrumental music for Martin Scorsese's film Raging Bull.

Kresa's was the first published arrangement of "All of Me," written by Gerald Marks and Seymour Simons.  He also acted as the arranger for Berlin for some stage musicals, including Call Me Madam (1952), Miss Liberty (1950) and Annie Get Your Gun (1949).

In 1926, Kresa began working for Berlin, where he  transcribed what Berlin was playing into musical manuscript form as Berlin could neither read nor write music, eventually becoming the general professional manager of the Irving Berlin Music Company.

He died of pneumonia in Southampton Hospital, Southampton, Long Island, New York.

His son is Kent Kresa.

References

1904 births
1991 deaths
people from Meissen
Deaths from pneumonia in New York (state)
Songwriters from New York (state)
20th-century American composers